Tennent is one of the original 18 districts of the Australian Capital Territory.

References 

Districts of the Australian Capital Territory
1966 establishments in Australia